Sopotnica may refer to: 

In Bosnia and Herzegovina:
Sopotnica (Novo Goražde), a settlement in the Municipality of Novo Goražde
Sopotnica (Kakanj), a settlement in the Municipality of Kakanj

In North Macedonia:
Sopotnica, Demir Hisar, a settlement in the Municipality of Demir Hisar

In Serbia:
Sopotnica (Gadžin Han), a settlement in the Municipality of Gadžin Han
Sopotnica (Prijepolje), a settlement in the Municipality of Prijepolje

In Slovenia:
Sopotnica, Škofja Loka, a settlement in the Municipality of Škofja Loka